Frank Napoli is a former Italy international rugby league footballer who played as a er for the Eastern Suburbs in the NSWRL Premiership and the ARL Premiership as well as the Gold Coast Chargers. He also played for the London Broncos in the European Super League.

References

External links
2000 Summary
Club Player Honour Roll 

Living people
Rugby league wingers
Gold Coast Chargers players
Italy national rugby league team players
London Broncos players
Sydney Roosters players
Australian rugby league players
Year of birth missing (living people)
Place of birth missing (living people)